Lawrence "Yogi" Horton (October 1, 1953June 8, 1987) was an American R&B, funk, jazz and rock drummer. Horton worked and recorded as a session and touring drummer with a wide variety of musicians such as Aretha Franklin, Luther Vandross, John Lennon, Yoko Ono, Ashford & Simpson, David Byrne, Deborah Harry, Hall & Oates, Diana Ross, Kenny G, The B-52's, and Jean-Michel Jarre among numerous others. His first recording was on Dave "Baby" Cortez's 1972 album Soul Vibration.

Horton recorded an instructional videocassette in 1983, which was released by DCI. Titled "The History of R&B/Funk Drumming", it is considered to be "one of the first instructional type videos of its kind." The video is long out of print, but can still be viewed on YouTube as of March 2021.

Horton, who suffered from bipolar disorder, died on June 8, 1987, when he jumped from a 17th-floor hotel window in New York shortly after performing in a Luther Vandross concert. Was (Not Was) dedicated their 1988 album What Up, Dog? to Horton; he performed on the album and it was released after his death.

Discography

The Catherine Wheel (David Byrne, 1981)
With Lonnie Liston Smith
Dreams of Tomorrow (Doctor Jazz, 1983)
With Gloria Gaynor
 Gloria Gaynor (Atlantic Records, 1982)
With Irene Cara
 Anyone Can See (Network Records, 1982)
With John Lennon and Yoko Ono
 Milk and Honey (Geffen, 1984)
With George Benson
 While the City Sleeps... (Warner Bros. Records, 1986)
With Linda Clifford
 I'll Keep on Loving You (Capitol, 1982)
With Ben E. King
 Street Tough (Atlantic Records, 1981)
With Cheryl Lynn
 Instant Love (Columbia Records, 1982)
 Preppie (Columbia Records, 1983)
With Aretha Franklin
 Jump to It (Arista Records, 1982)
 Get It Right (Arista Records, 1983)
 Who's Zoomin' Who? (Arista Records, 1985)
 Aretha (Arista Records, 1986)
 Through the Storm (Arista Records, 1989)
With Yoko Ono
 It's Alright (I See Rainbows) (Polygram Records, 1982)
With Jean Michel Jarre

 Zoolook (Disques Dreyfus, 1984)

With John Phillips
 Pay Pack & Follow (Eagle Records, 2001)
With Stephanie Mills
 Tantalizingly Hot (Casablanca Records, 1982)
 If I Were Your Woman (MCA Records, 1987)
With Was (Not Was)
 What Up, Dog? (Chrysalis Records, 1988)

References

American session musicians
American rock drummers
American funk drummers
African-American drummers
American jazz drummers
American male drummers
1953 births
1987 suicides
20th-century American drummers
Rhythm and blues drummers
Soul drummers
20th-century American male musicians
Suicides by jumping in New York City
People with bipolar disorder
American male jazz musicians
20th-century African-American musicians